Rossbridge is a town in the north west region of Victoria, Australia. Rossbridge has a population of 27, as of the 2021 Census.

Established on the Ararat to coast road in the 1860s, the town gained its name from Ross's Bridge at the crossing of the Hopkins River. the bridge gained its name from named in turn after John Ross, selector of the Mount William Plains pastoral run. By the 1870s a church, school and a number of residences were established. Ross Bridge Post Office opened on 21 November 1873 and closed in on 2 March 1962. As an early grazing district, the town had its share of tragedy, with four children dying in a house fire on 9 February 1863.

Notable people
Australian politician John McDougall attended Rossbridge Common School, later becoming a staunch anticapitalist and anti war campaigner.

References

Towns in Victoria (Australia)
Western District (Victoria)